Zinc finger protein 707 is a protein in humans that is encoded by the ZNF707 gene.

References

Further reading 

Genes on human chromosome 8